The statue of James Henry Greathead, designed by James Butler, is installed outside the Royal Exchange, where it conceals a ventilation shaft.  It was erected in 1994 on a traffic island in the middle of Cornhill, London, with traffic passing to either side, similar to the statue of Prince Albert at Holborn Circus.  The London Troops War Memorial is nearby.

Background
James Henry Greathead was a South African civil engineer best known for his work on the railway lines now incorporated into the London Underground. Greathead was an engineer on the London (City) & Southwark Subway, later the City and South London Railway, and now part of the Northern line, which has a station near to the statue at Bank.

Description and history
The bronze statue depicts a bearded Greathead wearing a broad-brimmed hat (an allusion to his South African origins) and carrying a coat over his right arm, holding a piece of paper which he is reading.  It stands on a hollow oval Portland stone base with granite plinth.  The base bears a bronze plaque on one side depicting a tunnelling shield with an inscription that credits Greathead as being the "inventor of the travelling shield that made possible the cutting of the tunnels of London's deep level tube system".  (A part of the tunnelling shield used at Bank station was rediscovered during a refurbishment, and left visible painted red in a passageway leading to the Waterloo & City line.) The other side of the base bears the carved stone badge of the City & South London Railway.

Visible in a gap between the statue and the base are the metal grilles of a vent shaft installed at Bank Junction to meet safety standards introduced after the King's Cross fire in 1987. The statute was unveiled by the Lord Mayor of London Sir Paul Newell on 17 January 1994.

References

External links

 James Henry Greathead, Tunnelling Expert and Railway Engineer (1844–1896), victorianweb.org
 James Henry Henry Greathead's statue, London Walking Tours
 greathead.org

1994 establishments in England
1994 sculptures
Buildings and structures completed in 1994
Statue of James Henry Greahead
Monuments and memorials in London
Outdoor sculptures in London
Sculptures of men in the United Kingdom
Statues in London